Raiza Beltran (born 26 August 1994) is a Cuban handball player. She plays for the club Guantánamo and is member of the Cuban national team. She competed at the 2015 World Women's Handball Championship in Denmark.

References

1994 births
Living people
Cuban female handball players
Handball players at the 2015 Pan American Games
Pan American Games competitors for Cuba